Thomas Whitfield Marshall (born January 6, 1973) is a former American football linebacker who played two seasons in the National Football League (NFL) with the Philadelphia Eagles and Atlanta Falcons. He was drafted by the Philadelphia Eagles in the fifth round of the 1996 NFL Draft. He played college football at the University of Georgia  and attended The Lovett School in Atlanta, Georgia. Marshall was also a member of the Indianapolis Colts and Frankfurt Galaxy.

References

External links
Just Sports Stats

Living people
1973 births
Players of American football from Atlanta
American football linebackers
Georgia Bulldogs football players
Philadelphia Eagles players
Frankfurt Galaxy players
Atlanta Falcons players
The Lovett School alumni